Cary Hudson is an American lead singer, guitarist and main songwriter of the alternative country/Southern rock band Blue Mountain.

Biography
Hudson was born in the town of Sumrall, Mississippi, located approximately 15 miles from Hattiesburg.  Prior to Blue Mountain, Hudson was in a band called The Hilltops, and Blue Mountain formed out of The Hilltops.  Blue Mountain featured numerous drummers, most infamously Frank Coutch, and bassist/wife of Hudson, Laurie Stirratt.

After the divorce of Hudson and Stirratt, Blue Mountain split, and Hudson embarked on a solo career that spawned three albums released on his and his cousin Chris Hudson's record label, Black Dog Records.  The first album, The Phoenix was released in 2002.  Though Hudson shows his country roots often, many of the tracks offer him showing his talent for the electric guitar, such as the track "Mad, Bad, & Dangerous".

His second album, Cool Breeze released in 2004, finds Hudson once again using his guitar to show his talent.  This album, however, has a more rustic feel to it.  Those who are familiar with the area that Hudson grew up will know many of the places that he mentions in the songs.  Cool Breeze is a very diverse album, with there being no way that you can pin any one sound to it.

His 3rd solo album, the appropriately titled Bittersweet Blues, allows Hudson to strip away the electric guitar and record an exclusively acoustic album.  Every song displays Hudson's amazing song writing talent and pure bluesy voice.  From the opening "Snow in Mississippi", the album is a mature, addictive, rush of pure Mississippi music that engulfs your mind and captures your soul.  As a songwriter, Hudson is possibly at the finest of his entire career on this album.  The XM Radio hit, "Berlin Blues", is the ninth track on the record.

In 2007, Hudson reunited with Blue Mountain, and he put his solo career on hold.  He resides in his hometown of Sumrall, and can often be seen by the locals of nearby towns as he plays solo shows at some of the establishments in Hattiesburg.

In 2008, Cary Hudson named one of the best in the Gibson magazine's list of Top 10 Alt.Country Guitarists of all time.

In 2013, Blue Mountain once again dissolved and Hudson has now refocused on his solo output.  He released Town and Country album in the summer of 2014 and continues to tour on his own.

Solo discography
The Phoenix (2002)
Cary Hudson Electric Trio Live in Wredenhagen (2002) – live
Cool Breeze (2004)
Bittersweet Blues (2006)
Seems to Me (2010)
Mississippi Moon (2011)
Town and Country (2014)

References

External links

1965 births
Living people
American alternative country singers
American blues guitarists
American male guitarists
American country rock singers
American country singer-songwriters
American male singer-songwriters
American Southern Rock musicians
Singer-songwriters from Mississippi
People from Sumrall, Mississippi
Guitarists from Mississippi
20th-century American guitarists
Country musicians from Mississippi
20th-century American male musicians